Daniel Frederick Hart is an American musician and composer. He is a classically trained violinist. Hart has released music as a solo artist and with his bands The Physics of Meaning and Dark Rooms. Hart has also toured with and recorded for numerous bands, including St. Vincent, Other Lives, John Vanderslice, Swans, The Rosebuds, Annuals, Glasser, Broken Social Scene, Pattern Is Movement, Mount Moriah, The Polyphonic Spree and Sarah Jaffe. In 2012, Hart wrote and recorded the score for David Lowery's film Ain't Them Bodies Saints, which premiered at Sundance Film Festival in 2013. In 2016, Hart composed the score for Pete's Dragon, and in 2017 Hart composed the score for A Ghost Story and in 2021 for The Green Knight.

Early life

Daniel Hart was born in Emporia, Kansas, where his parents worked as church musicians. He began playing the violin at age three. Hart graduated from Southern Methodist University's Meadows School of the Arts. After graduating college, he joined AmeriCorps and worked for a non-profit in New York City.

Career

Music
Hart moved to North Carolina in 2002 and, along with David Karsten Daniels, John Ribo, Perry Wright, and Alex Lazara, founded the Bu Hanan record label. While in North Carolina, Hart formed the band The Physics of Meaning, releasing two studio albums. During this time, Hart began touring extensively in several bands. Hart played violin with The Polyphonic Spree, including opening for David Bowie in 2004. Hart was also a member of St. Vincent's band from 2007 through 2010, and he contributed to the albums Marry Me, Actor, and Strange Mercy. Hart released his first solo record, The Orientalist, in 2011. In 2013, Hart's new band Dark Rooms released their debut self-titled album.  During his stint in North Carolina, Daniel also performed and recorded with the group Project Mastana, playing violin on their record, Backroads to Bollywood.

Composing
In 2009, director David Lowery asked Hart to write some music for his first feature film St. Nick. Hart wrote two short compositions for the film, which began Lowery and Hart's collaboration. Hart has scored all of David Lowery's films to date, and the two feel that they share a similar aesthetic vision for storytelling.

In 2012, Hart scored Lowery's breakout feature Ain't Them Bodies Saints, and Hart was subsequently named one of Filmmaker Magazine's "25 Faces of Independent Film" in 2013. The score mixes chamber orchestral arrangements of strings and horns with more traditional folk instruments, such as the banjo, mandolin, kneeslaps and handclaps.

Following the release of Ain't Them Bodies Saints, Hart scored half a dozen independent feature films over the next two years, including Comet (2014), Return to Sender (2015), Uncertain (2015), and Lost in the Sun (2015), Tumbledown (2015), and The Girlfriend Game (2015).

Hart and Lowery next teamed up in 2016 for Disney's Pete's Dragon, an adaptation of the 1977 musical film of the same name. Hart's score was written for a 94-piece orchestra and 32-person choir, by far the largest ensemble for which Hart has written music. Hart composed the score in three months, working "seven days a week, eleven to twelve hours a day" to finish it in time.

Hart's next project was Season One of Fox's TV series The Exorcist, which debuted on September 23, 2016, and is based on the William Peter Blatty novel of the same name.

In February 2017, Hart was nominated for IFMCA's Breakthrough Composer of the Year, for his work on Pete's Dragon and television series The Exorcist.

On March 28, 2017, Daniel Hart released his composition for the soundtrack to the podcast "S-Town". The music is moody and brooding, and contemplative, a perfect foil to the subject matter of the podcast itself.

Personal life
Hart currently resides in Los Angeles.

Discography

Studio albums

The Physics of Meaning
The Physics of Meaning (2005)
Snake Charmer and Destiny at the Stroke of Midnight (2008)

Solo
The Orientalist (2011)

Dark Rooms
Dark Rooms (2013)
 Distraction Sickness (2017)

Filmography

Film

Television

References

External links

Daniel Hart website

1976 births
American classical violinists
American film score composers
American indie pop musicians
American indie rock musicians
American male film score composers
American male songwriters
American television composers
Living people
Male classical violinists
Male television composers
Musicians from Texas
Songwriters from Texas